Serkam is a mukim and town in Jasin District in the Malaysian state of Malacca.

Economy
 Serkam Industrial Area - the town's main industrial area. Notable tenants include Melaka Halal Hub Sdn Bhd, a fully owned subsidiary of the Malacca State Development Corporation.

Places of worship
 Serkam Jamek Mosque

Tourist attractions
 Ikan bakar Food Court.

See also
 Jasin District

References

Jasin District
Mukims of Malacca